That's Thames Valley is a local television station serving greater Reading, Berkshire, England. It is owned and operated by That's TV and broadcasts on Freeview channel 7 and Virgin Media 159 from studios in central Reading.

Ofcom, the national broadcasting regulator, invited licence applications in 2013 and estimated that the service could reach approximately 170,000 homes in the Reading area. That's TV was chosen for Reading in 2014 and the licence for the service was granted in March 2017 for the period 10 May 2017 to 25 November 2025.

References 

Local television channels in the United Kingdom
Culture in Reading, Berkshire
Mass media in Berkshire
2017 establishments in England